Dizbad-e Sofla (also Romanized as Dīzbād-e Soflá; also known as Dīzbād-e Pā’īn, Dīzābād-e Pā’īn, Dīzābād Pā’īn, Dizbād, Dizbād-i-Pāīn, and Dozdāb-e Pā’īn) is a village in Piveh Zhan Rural District, Ahmadabad District, Mashhad County, Razavi Khorasan Province, Iran. At the 2006 census, its population was 2,963, in 747 families.

References 

Populated places in Mashhad County